The Green Forest Water Tower is a historic water tower, located near the junction of South Springfield and East Second Streets in Green Forest, Arkansas.  It consists of a metal supporting structure with four legs and cross bracing, supporting a water tank with a bowl-shaped bottom, with a water pipe in the center of the structure connecting the tank to the water system.  The tank was built in 1937 by the Chicago Bridge and Iron Works Company with funding from the Public Works Administration.  It is the only known surviving PWA-funded tower in Carroll County.

The tower was listed on the National Register of Historic Places in 2007.

See also
National Register of Historic Places listings in Carroll County, Arkansas

References

Water towers on the National Register of Historic Places in Arkansas
Towers completed in 1937
Buildings and structures in Carroll County, Arkansas
National Register of Historic Places in Carroll County, Arkansas
1937 establishments in Arkansas